You Quan (born January 1954) is a Chinese politician who is the former director of the United Front Work Department and a former secretary of the Secretariat of the Chinese Communist Party. He previously served as Communist Party Secretary of Fujian province and chairman of Fujian People's Congress.

Biography
You Quan was born in Beijing, but by Chinese convention he is considered a native of his ancestral home Lulong County, Hebei province. He attended Renmin University and graduated with a degree in economic planning in 1984. He also has a master's degree in economics from Renmin University which he received in 1987.

You entered the work force in September 1969, and joined the Chinese Communist Party in March 1973.  Starting in June 1995 he worked in the State Council of China, rising through the ranks to become chairman of the State Electricity Regulatory Commission in December 2006.  In March 2008, he became a Deputy Secretary-General of the State Council, a minister-level post, working under Ma Kai.

In December 2012, You Quan was appointed the Party Committee Secretary of coastal Fujian province, succeeding Sun Chunlan who was transferred to Tianjin municipality.  In February 2013, he acquired the additional position as chairman of Fujian People's Congress.

In 2017, You Quan was elevated to the Secretariat of the Chinese Communist Party and appointed Director of the United Front Work Department of the CCP Central Committee. You Quan was an alternate member of the 17th Central Committee, and is a full member of the 18th and 19th Central Committees of the Chinese Communist Party. 

In 2018, at a meeting with leaders of China’s minority parties he emphasized their importance for external propaganda purposes and instructed part leaders to “talk about the ‘China story’ of multiparty cooperation.”

U.S. sanctions 

On Jan 15, 2021, You Quan was designated by U.S. Department of State as connected with the National Security Law (NSL), pursuant to Executive Order (E.O.) 13936, “The President’s Executive Order on Hong Kong Normalization.”, and added to OFAC's SDN List.

References 

Living people
1954 births
Political office-holders in Fujian
Chinese Communist Party politicians from Beijing
People's Republic of China politicians from Beijing
Members of the 18th Central Committee of the Chinese Communist Party
Alternate members of the 17th Central Committee of the Chinese Communist Party
Members of the 19th Central Committee of the Chinese Communist Party
Individuals sanctioned by the United States under the Hong Kong Autonomy Act
Chinese individuals subject to U.S. Department of the Treasury sanctions